Thermal amplitude or thermal range refers to the temperature range in which a cold autoantibody or cold-reacting alloantibody binds to its antigen.  Cold antibodies that can bind to antigen above  are considered potentially clinically significant and may lead to disease that occurs or worsens on exposure to low temperatures. The closer the thermal range comes to core body temperature (37 °C or 99 °F), the greater the chance that the antibody will cause symptoms such as anemia or Raynaud syndrome. Antibodies that are only reactive at temperatures below  are generally considered unlikely to be clinically significant.

References

Medical tests
Autoimmune diseases
Antibodies